Amanda Foreman is an American actress best known for her role as Meghan Rotundi on the college drama series Felicity (1998–2002).

Career
Foreman has worked on four series produced and/or created by J. J. Abrams. On Felicity, she played Felicity's college roommate, Meghan Rotundi, a Wiccan who in "Help for the Lovelorn" (January 23, 2000), an homage to The Twilight Zone uses her magic on Felicity. She was a recurring guest star until 2006 on the spy drama Alias, where she played Carrie Bowman, an NSA agent and the wife of Marshall Flinkman (Kevin Weisman).  Foreman later starred as Ivy on ABC's What About Brian, which was canceled in May 2007.

Foreman has guest starred on shows such as Nash Bridges, Six Feet Under, ER, and In Plain Sight. She also had a recurring role on Private Practice, which she reprised in Season 4.

Foreman had a recurring role  on Parenthood as Suze Lessing.

Filmography

Film

Television

References

External links 
 

American film actresses
American television actresses
Living people
Actresses from Los Angeles
21st-century American actresses
Year of birth missing (living people)